The Modern Art of Jazz may refer to:

The Modern Art of Jazz by Zoot Sims (Dawn, 1956)
The Modern Art of Jazz by Randy Weston (Dawn, 1956)